The Women's 800m athletics events for the 2016 Summer Paralympics take place at the Estádio Olímpico João Havelange from September 16 to September 17, 2016. A total of three events were contested over this distance for three different classifications.

Schedule

Medal summary

Results

The following were the results of the finals of each of the Women's 800 metres events in each of the classifications. Further details of each event are available on that event's dedicated page.

T34

18:11 16 September 2016:

T53

17:46 17 September 2016:

T54

17:53 17 September 2016:

References

Athletics at the 2016 Summer Paralympics